Marc-Adolphe Guégan (1891–1959) was a French journalist and poet who was an early exponent of Japanese haiku in the French language.

He lived on the Île d'Yeu in the Atlantic.

He was a friend of Claude Cahun (née Lucy Schwob) and Suzanne Malherbe (artist name: Marcel Moore), with whom he collaborated on two books.

An exhibition about his life and work was held during July–August 2009 on the île d'Yeu.

Bibliography

 L'Invitation à la fête primitive (1921), with a triptych, "les Trois Epoques", by Marcel Moore - poetry
 Oya-Insula ou l'Enfant à la conque (1923), with a print by Moore - poetry 
 Trois petits tours et puis s'en vont (1924) - poetry
 Mystique des tempêtes (1927) - poetry
 Marc-Adolphe Guégan, poète de l'Île d'Yeu (2009) by Jean-François Henry

References

1891 births
1959 deaths
French male poets
20th-century French poets
20th-century French male writers
French male non-fiction writers